The Lingones (Gaulish: 'the jumpers') were a Gallic tribe of the Iron Age and Roman periods. They dwelled in the region surrounding the present-day city of Langres, between the provinces of Gallia Lugdunensis and Gallia Belgica.

Name

Attestations 
They are mentioned as Língōnes (Λίγγωνες) by Polybius (2nd c. BC), Lingones by Caesar (mid-1st c. BC), Pliny (1st c. AD) and Tacitus (early 2nd c. AD), Díngones (Δίγγονες) by Strabo (early 1st c. AD), and as Lóngōnes (Λόγγωνες) by Ptolemy (2nd c. AD).

Etymology 
The Gaulish ethnonym Lingones literally means 'the jumpers'. It derives from the stem ling- ('to jump'), itself from the Proto-Celtic verbal base *leng- ('to jump'; cf. Old Irish lingid 'he jumps'), extended by the suffix -on-es. The name could be interpreted as 'good at jumping (on horseback)', or else as 'the dancers'.

The city of Langres, attested ca. 400 AD as civitas Lingonum, is named after the Gallic tribe.

Geography 
The territory of the Lingones was situated on the border separating Gallia Lugdunensis from Gallia Belgica, between the Senones and the Sequani.

Settlement 
Their capital Andematunnum (present-day Langres, Haute-Marne) is attested from 43 AD on boundary markers (abbreviated as AND). It was built on a Bajocian limestone promontory, overlooking the Marne valley to the east and north, and the Bonnelle valley to the west. Only the southern part, open to the Langres plateau, did not possess natural defences. Archeological evidence have demonstrated a continuity between the La Tène and Roman periods on the site of Langres, and the city of Andematunnum appears to have been built at the turn of the 1st century BC on a previous Gallic settlement. The Roman-era civitas of the Lingones was located at the crossroad of the modern départments of Aube, Haute-Marne, Côte d’Or and Yonne.

The Cathedral St-Mammes, built in the Burgundian Romanesque style for the ancient diocese that was referred to as Lingonae ("of the Lingones") and rivalled Dijon. Three of its early bishops were martyred by the invasion of the Vandals, about 407.

History 
Some of the Lingones migrated across the Alps and settled near the mouth of the Po River in Cisalpine Gaul of northern Italy around 400 BC. These Lingones were part of a wave of Celtic tribes that included the Boii and Senones (Polybius, Histories ii.17). The Lingones may have helped sack Rome in 390 BC.

The Gaulish Lingones did not participate in the battles of the Gauls against Caesar. They gained Roman citizenship at the end of the first century AD. They were caught up in the Batavian rebellion (69 AD) described by Tacitus.

The strategist Sextus Julius Frontinus, author of the Strategemata, the earliest surviving Roman military textbook, mentions the Lingones among his examples of successful military tactics:

In Roman Britain, at least three named cohorts of Lingones, probably subscripted from among the Lingones who had remained in the area of Langres and Dijon are attested in the 2nd and 3rd centuries, from dedicatory inscriptions and stamped tiles. The 1st cohort of Lingones (part-mounted ) is attested at Bremenium, the 2nd cohort of Lingones is attested at Ilkley Roman Fort by their Prefect, and the fourth cohort built part of Hadrian's Wall near Carlisle.

Religion 
During the Roman period, Mars Cicolluis was the main god of the Lingones.

See also
Ancient peoples of Italy
Celts in the Alps and Po Valley
Lepontii
Prehistoric Italy

References

Bibliography

External links
Livius.org: Lingones
Livius.org: Lingones in the Batavian revolt
Second Cohort of Lingones in Roman Britain
 Lingones in Italy

 
Historical Celtic peoples
Gauls
Tribes of pre-Roman Gaul
Auxiliary infantry units of ancient Rome